The Canon EOS 500D is a 15-megapixel entry-level digital single-lens reflex camera, announced by Canon on 25 March 2009. It was released in May 2009. It is known as the EOS Kiss X3 in Japan, and as the EOS Rebel T1i in North America. It continues the Rebel line of mid-range DSLR cameras, is placed by Canon as the next model up from the EOS 450D, and has been superseded by the EOS 550D (T2i).

It is the third digital single-lens reflex camera to feature a movie mode and the second to feature full 1080p video recording, albeit at the rate of 20 frames/sec. The camera shares a few features with the high-end Canon EOS 5D Mark II, including movie mode, Live preview, and DiGIC 4. Like the EOS 450D and EOS 1000D, it uses SDHC media storage, and is the third EOS model to use that medium instead of CompactFlash. Like the EOS 5D Mark II, video clips are recorded as MOV (QuickTime) files with H.264/MPEG-4 compressed video and linear PCM audio.

Features
 15.1-megapixel CMOS sensor Type APS-C, 22.3 x 14.9mm CMOS
 Type – TTL-CT-SIR with a CMOS sensor
 DIGIC 4 image processor
 14-bit analog to digital signal conversion
 3.0-inch (76 mm) LCD monitor
 Live view mode and built-in flash
 Wide, selectable, nine-point AF with centre cross-type sensors
 Four metering modes, using 35-zones: spot, partial, center-weighted average, and evaluative metering.
 Auto lighting optimizer
 Highlight tone priority
 EOS integrated cleaning system
 sRGB and AdobeRGB colour spaces
 ISO 100–12,800
 ISO Sensitivity (8) – AUTO(100–1600), 100, 200, 400, 800, 1600, 3200 Expandable to 6400 + H (approx 12800) in 1-stop increments
 Continuous drive up to 3.4 frame/s (170 images (JPEG), 9 images (raw))
 Canon EF/EF-S lenses
 PAL/NTSC video output
 SD and SDHC memory card file storage
 Raw and large JPEG simultaneous recording
 USB 2.0 and HDMI interfaces.
 LP-E5 battery
 Approximate weight 0.475 kg
 Metering Range – EV 1–20 (at 23 °C with 50mm f/1.4 lens ISO100)
 Low-Pass Filter – Built-in/Fixed with Self Cleaning Sensor Unit
 AWB, Daylight, Shade, Cloudy, Tungsten, White, Fluorescent light, Flash, Custom. White balance compensation: 1. Blue/Amber +/-9, 2. Magenta/ Green +/-9
 WB Bracketing – +/-3 levels in single level increments, 3 bracketed images per shutter release. Selectable Blue/Amber bias or Magenta/ Green bias
 Viewfinder Information – AF information: AF points, focus confirmation light.
 Exposure information: Shutter speed, aperture value, ISO speed (always displayed), AE lock, exposure level/compensation, spot metering circle, exposure warning, AEB.
 Flash information: Flash ready, high-speed sync, FE lock, flash exposure compensation, red-eye reduction light. Image information: White balance correction, SD card information, monochrome shooting, maximum burst (1 digit display), Highlight tone priority (D+)

Alternative firmware
Though not endorsed by Canon, the firmware of the camera allows for the installation of third-party custom firmware, altering the features of the camera. One example of such firmware is Magic Lantern.

Reception
The Canon EOS 500D received favorable reviews on its release.

IT Reviews gave the camera a Recommended Award, and concluded: "Canon's DSLR range continues to go from strength to strength with this considerably enhanced upgrade of the EOS 450D, which manages to keep almost all of the previous physical features while improving the processor and the ISO range and adding a new Full HD video facility".

Digital Photography Review said: "For anybody buying their first DSLR the 500D is an easy recommendation but you might want to have a look at the Nikon D5000 as well. It comes with a similar feature set to the 500D ('only' 720P video though) and performs slightly better in low light".

Alternatives and comparisons
Alternative cameras to the Canon EOS 500D:
 Sony Alpha 380 Digital SLR Camera
 Sony Alpha 35 Digital SLT Camera
 Olympus E-420 Digital SLR Camera
 Nikon D90 12.3MP Digital SLR Camera
 Panasonic Lumix DMC-GF1 Micro Four-Thirds Camera
 Pentax K-x Digital SLR Camera

Next level upgrade cameras from the Canon EOS 500D:
 Canon EOS Rebel T2i (550D) Digital SLR Camera
 Panasonic DMC-GH1 Digital SLR Camera

Economical alternatives to the Canon EOS 500D:
 Canon Rebel XSi (450D) Digital SLR Camera
 Nikon D5000 Digital SLR Camera

References

Sources
 Canon EOS Rebel T1i (500D) Digital SLR Kit w/EF-S 18-55mm f/3.5-5.6 IS Lens & Canon EF-S 55-250mm f/4-5.6 IS Autofocus Lens Reviews

External links

 Product Page
 EOS 500D in the UK

500D
Live-preview digital cameras